Kasturba Medical College, Manipal and Kasturba Medical College, Mangalore, together known as KMC, are two private medical colleges in coastal Karnataka, India, established in 1953. The colleges were established as a single unit and later became two colleges with their own teaching hospitals. KMC was the first self-financing medical college in India. The colleges are constituent units of Manipal Academy of Higher Education, formerly known as Manipal University, an Institution of Eminence Deemed to be University.

History

Early years 
The colleges were established as a single institution in 1953 by T M A Pai with the pre-clinical section at Manipal and the clinical section in Mangalore at Wenlock District Hospital. Manipal and Mangalore were then a part of the erstwhile Madras state. The government of Madras granted land to establish a college and permitted the use of government hospitals for training medical students. The first batch of students arrived in Mangalore in 1955 for their clinical training. In 1956, the colleges became part of the expanded Mysore state which was then renamed as Karnataka.

Separation 
The clinical program commenced at Manipal in 1969 with the setting up of Kasturba Hospital. The colleges were later separated with the establishment of a pre-clinical section in Mangalore. Kasturba Medical College, Mangalore is attached to three government hospitals and was the first medical institution in India to be established as a public-private partnership.

Affiliation with public universities 
From their establishment in 1953, until 1993, the colleges were affiliated with public universities in Karnataka. The colleges were affiliated to Karnatak University from their establishment until 1964. They were affiliated to Mysore University from 1965 to 1980 and to Mangalore University from 1981 to 1992.

Deemed university 
In 1993, KMC Manipal and KMC Mangalore, along with colleges of dental surgery in Manipal and Mangalore were given deemed university status to form the Manipal Academy of Higher Education. In 2017, KMC Mangalore agreed to build a super specialty hospital at District Wenlock Hospital and extended its public private partnership with the government of Karnataka for another 33 years, i.e., until 2050.

Campuses

Manipal 
KMC Manipal is located in the university town of Manipal, a suburb in Udupi, Karnataka. It is situated within the campus of Manipal Academy of Higher Education. The campus at Manipal has a large Health Sciences Library and a Museum of Anatomy and Pathology.

Mangalore 
KMC Mangalore is located in Mangalore. The campus at Mangalore is split into the Centre for Basic Sciences at Bejai and the main campus at Light House Hill Road.The campus includes six teaching hospitals, the T M A Pai Convention Centre and a large indoor sports complex.

Connectivity 
The nearest airport is Mangalore International Airport.

Academics

Courses 
Bachelor of Medicine and Bachelor of Surgery (MBBS) is the basic undergraduate medical degree awarded by the Manipal Academy of Higher Education at both the colleges after nine semesters of coursework and one year of internship. Postgraduate Doctor of Medicine (MD) and Master of Surgery (MS) are awarded after three years of residential training. Postdoctoral Doctorate of Medicine (DM) and Master of Chirurgiae (MCh) degrees are awarded after three years of postdoctoral super specialty training as a senior resident.

Rankings 

 KMC Manipal and KMC Mangalore were ranked 10th and 23rd respectively among the medical colleges of India in the NIRF 2021 Rankings. 
 Manipal Academy of Higher Education was ranked 7th among universities in India in the NIRF 2021 Rankings.
 Manipal Academy of Higher Education was ranked in the 351-400 rank bracket in Medicine in the QS World University Rankings 2021, the third in India after AIIMS, New Delhi and PGIMER, Chandigarh.

Admission
KMC Manipal and KMC Mangalore admit 250 students each for the undergraduate MBBS course. Admission is based on the 'All India Rank' obtained in NEET (UG) conducted by NTA. 20% of the MBBS seats in KMC Mangalore are retained for candidates from Karnataka as part of the public private partnership. Admissions to postgraduate and super specialty courses are based on the rank obtained in NEET (PG) and NEET (SS) respectively. Admissions to nursing, physiotherapy, psychology and other allied health courses are based on the score obtained in the Manipal Entrance Test.

Examinations 
The examinations at KMC Manipal and KMC Mangalore are conducted by the Manipal Academy of Higher Education according to guidelines laid down by the National Medical Commission. All exams are paperless and are written on a biometric secured tablet using a stylus.

Teaching hospitals

KMC Manipal 

 Kasturba Hospital, Manipal
 Dr. T.M.A Pai Rotary Hospital

KMC Mangalore 
Unlike most medical colleges in India, KMC Mangalore is attached to both government and private hospitals.
 District Wenlock Hospital
 Lady Goschen Hospital
 KMC Hospital, Attavar
 KMC Hospital, Ambedkar Circle
 Regional Advanced Pediatric Care Centre

Manipal Hospitals 
Manipal Hospitals is a chain of multi-specialty hospitals in India. The hospitals trace their origins to the Kasturba Medical College. It is the second largest healthcare provider in India. Its network spread across 24 locations in India. The first hospital of the chain was established in 1991 in Bengaluru. In 1997, the second hospital of the chain was established as KMC Hospital (Ambedkar Circle), a 251-bed tertiary care hospital and also a teaching hospital of the Kasturba Medical College, Mangalore.

Manipal Hospitals uses IBM Watson for Oncology since 2016. Watson is the first commercially available cognitive computing cloud platform that analyzes high volumes of data understands complex queries and proposes evidence based answers for them. Manipal Hospitals have become the first in the country and the second in the world to implement IBM Watson for diagnosis and treatment of cancer.

In April 2019 Manipal Hospitals was looking forward to acquire Medanta Hospitals. The deal however fell through since the two parties could not agree on the share price.

In 2021, Manipal Hospitals acquired Columbia Asia's India hospital chain for Rs 2,100 crore.

Notable people

References

External links 

Medical Council of India
Medical colleges in Karnataka
Manipal Academy of Higher Education schools
Educational institutions established in 1953
1953 establishments in Mysore State
Udupi
Private medical colleges in India
Memorials to Kasturba Gandhi
Universities and colleges in Udupi district